The 2018 Worthing Borough Council election took place on 3 May 2018 to elect members of Worthing Borough Council. This was on the same day as other local elections. A third of the council was up for election, meaning a total of 13 councillors were elected from all of the council's wards.

Despite suffering a net loss of two seats, the Conservative Party retained overall control of the council.

Council results

Ward results

Broadwater ward

Castle ward

Central ward

Durrington ward

Gaisford ward

Goring ward

Heene ward

Marine ward

Northbrook ward

Offington ward

Salvington ward

Selden ward

Tarring ward

References

2018 English local elections
2018